The Skogby railway station is located in the town of Raseborg (formerly the municipality of Tenala), Finland, in the village of Skogby. It is located along the Karis–Hanko railway, and its neighboring stations are Lappohja in the west and Ekenäs in the east.

Services 
Skogby is served by all regional trains on the Karis–Hanko line; the default type of rolling stock for this line is the Dm12 railbus.

References 

Raseborg
Railway stations in Uusimaa